János Váradi (born 28 February 1961 in Kemecse, Szabolcs-Szatmár-Bereg) is a retired Hungarian boxer, who won the bronze medal in the flyweight division (– 51 kg) at the 1980 Summer Olympics. He also captured the silver medals at the 1987 and 1989 European Amateur Boxing Championships.

Professional career
Váradi turned pro in 1990 and retired shortly thereafter, in 1991.  His record was 5-0-0 with one no contest.

Olympic Games
1980 Moscow Olympic Results - Boxed as a Flyweight (51 kg)
Round of 16 - Defeated Rabi Raj Thapa (Nepal) referee stopped contest in first round
Quarterfinals - Defeated Daniel Radu (Romania) by decision, 4-1
Semifinals - Lost to Viktor Miroshnichenko (Soviet Union) by decision, 1-4 (was awarded bronze medal)

1988 Seoul Olympic Results - Boxed as a Flyweight (51 kg)
Round of 64 - bye
Round of 32 - Defeated Roberto Jalnaiz (Philippines) by decision, 4-1
Round of 16 - Lost to Andreas Tews (East Germany) by decision, 0-5

External links
 

1961 births
Living people
Flyweight boxers
Boxers at the 1980 Summer Olympics
Boxers at the 1988 Summer Olympics
Olympic boxers of Hungary
Olympic bronze medalists for Hungary
Olympic medalists in boxing
Hungarian male boxers
Medalists at the 1980 Summer Olympics
AIBA World Boxing Championships medalists
Sportspeople from Szabolcs-Szatmár-Bereg County